Halltree is a hamlet in the Scottish Borders.

Etymology

The etymology of Halltree is debated, but the second element is likely to be a Cumbric word cognate with Welsh tref 'farmstead'. If so, the first element is probably also a Cumbric word such as hâl 'marsh'. Alternatively, the name might come from Old English, for example heald' 'sloping, bent' and trēow'' 'tree'.

References

Villages in the Scottish Borders